NZAC may refer to:

 New Zealand Alpine Club
 New Zealand Arthropod Collection
 New Zealand Association of Counsellors